Lhachen Palgyigon was the founding king of the Kingdom of Maryul, based in modern Ladakh.

Palgyigon was a son of Kyide Nyimagon, a descendant of the Old Tibetan dynasty, who unified the Western Tibet (Ngari) during the Tibetan Era of Fragmentation. Palgyigon was the eldest of three brothers, the other two being Trashigon and Detsukgon.

Palgyigon is said to have extended the kingdom of his father to the "Kashmir pass" (Zoji La) in the northwest, along what were referred to as the "lowlands of Ngari" (mar-yul of mṅah‐ris). He became an independent king after his father's death. The other two sons of Nyimagon, Trashigon and Detsukgon, also inherited the kingdoms of Guge‐Purang and Zanskar respectively. The three kingdoms together were referred to as "Ngari Korsum" ("the three divisions of Ngari").

The kingdom of Maryul lasted till 1842 when the Dogra general Zorawar Singh, having conquered it, made it part of the  princely state of Jammu and Kashmir.

References

Bibliography
 
 
 
 
 
 
 

Kings of Ladakh
930 births

960 deaths
Year of birth uncertain
Year of death uncertain